The Sessions–Pope–Sheild House, also known as Sessions House or Sheild House, is a historic home located at Yorktown, York County, Virginia.  It was built in 1691, and is a -story, five bay by two bay, brick Southern Colonial dwelling. It has a clipped gable roof with dormers. It has two "T"-shaped end chimney.  Also on the property is a contributing archaeological site.

It was added to the National Register of Historic Places in 2003.

References

External links
Sheild House, Pearl & Main Streets, Yorktown, York County, VA: 4 photos, 11 measured drawings, and 2 data pages at Historic American Buildings Survey

Historic American Buildings Survey in Virginia
Archaeological sites on the National Register of Historic Places in Virginia
Houses on the National Register of Historic Places in Virginia
Colonial architecture in Virginia
Houses completed in 1691
Houses in York County, Virginia
National Register of Historic Places in York County, Virginia
1691 establishments in Virginia